Abdol Ghadar is a town located in western Awdal, Somaliland.

Demographics
As of 2012, the population of Abdol Ghadar has been estimated to be 567. The town inhabitants belong to Gadabuursi clan of Somali heritage.

References

Populated places in Awdal